Yassine Bahassa (born 21 May 1992) is a French professional footballer who plays as a forward for Liga I club FC U Craiova.

Career
In June 2022, Bahassa signed with FC U Craiova in Romania.

Personal life 
Born in France, Bahassa is of Moroccan descent.

Honours 
Stade Bordelais
 Championnat de France Amateur 2: 2016–17

References

External links 
 US Quevilly-Rouen profile

1992 births
Living people
Sportspeople from Gironde
French sportspeople of Moroccan descent
French footballers
Association football forwards
Stade Bordelais (football) players
US Avranches players
US Quevilly-Rouen Métropole players
FC U Craiova 1948 players
Division d'Honneur players
Championnat National 3 players
Championnat National 2 players
Championnat National players
Liga I players
Ligue 2 players
Footballers from Nouvelle-Aquitaine
French expatriate footballers
Expatriate footballers in Romania
French expatriate sportspeople in Romania